Denis Ramilyevich Galimzyanov (born 7 March 1987 in Yekaterinburg, Russian SFSR, Soviet Union) is a former Russian racing cyclist, who last rode for UCI ProTeam . He obtained a major victory in the classic Paris–Brussels in 2011, where he imposed himself in a massive sprint after 218.5 kilometers of racing.

Doping
On 16 April 2012, Galimzyanov was provisionally suspended by the UCI, after testing positive for EPO in an out-of-competition drugs test in March. He admitted the charge the next day and said he took sole responsibility and had acted without the knowledge of his team. In December, it was announced that Galimzyanov was suspended for two years, starting retroactively on 13 April 2012.

He did not return to the peloton after completion of the ban.

Major results

2006
 1st Stage 8 Way to Pekin
 1st Stage 4b Tour of Bulgaria
2007
 1st GP Sochi
 1st Mayor Cup
 1st Stage 5 Five Rings of Moscow
 1st Stage 5 Tour de Berlin
 1st Prologue & Stage 3 Tour of Hainan
2008
 1st Stage 5 Tour de Normandie
 1st Overall Five Rings of Moscow
 1st Stages 1b, 2, 3 & 5
 1st Stage 3 Bałtyk–Karkonosze Tour
 1st Stage 1 Tour of Sochi
2009
 5th Nokere Koerse
2010
 1st Stage 3 (TTT) Vuelta a Burgos
 2nd Grand Prix d'Isbergues
 4th Grand Prix de Denain
 9th Binche–Tournai–Binche
2011
 1st  Points classification Three Days of De Panne
 1st Stage 2
 1st Stage 1 Tour de Luxembourg
 1st Paris–Brussels
 1st  Points classification Tour of Beijing
 1st Stage 5
 2nd Scheldeprijs
 3rd Memorial Rik Van Steenbergen
2012
 1st Stage 1 Circuit de la Sarthe

See also
List of doping cases in cycling

References

External links

Denis Galimzyanov profile at 

1987 births
Living people
Russian male cyclists
Sportspeople from Yekaterinburg
Doping cases in cycling
Russian sportspeople in doping cases